Pakubuwono V (also transliterated Pakubuwana V) (13 December 1784 – 5 September 1823) was the fifth Susuhunan (ruler of Surakarta) . He reigned from 1820 to 1823.

Notes

References
Miksic, John N. (general ed.), et al. (2006)  Karaton Surakarta. A look into the court of Surakarta Hadiningrat, central Java (First published: 'By the will of His Serene Highness Paku Buwono XII'. Surakarta: Yayasan Pawiyatan Kabudayan Karaton Surakarta, 2004)  Marshall Cavendish Editions  Singapore  

Burials at Imogiri
Susuhunan of Surakarta
1784 births
1823 deaths
Indonesian royalty